Acanthosquilla is a genus of stomatopod crustacean. The American carcinologist Raymond B. Manning named and first circumscribed the genus in 1963. , the World Register of Marine Species recognizes the following eight species:

 A. crosnieri 
 A. derijardi 
 A. manningi 
 A. melissae 
 A. multifasciata 
 A. multispinosa 
 A. tigrina 
 A. wilsoni

References

Further reading

 
 

Stomatopoda
Malacostraca genera
Taxa named by Raymond B. Manning
Crustaceans described in 1963